Mark Lane is a British television gardening presenter, landscape designer and writer. Born in Hertfordshire in 1969 he is also a landscape designer, and the UK’s first BBC gardening presenter who uses a wheelchair.

Mark was born with spina bifida and in 2000 he had a car accident which led to operations on his spine. Mark use a wheelchair full time.

After graduating from University College London in Art History his career led him to work at the Royal Institute of British Architects (RIBA)  where he eventually became the Publishing Director. After this he moved to the Arts publisher Thames & Hudson as Managing Editor.

Mark's love for gardening led him to retrain as a garden designer via an Open Learning course.

Once Mark had retrained he combined writing for newspapers and gardening magazines.

Mark's break into TV presenting occurred after the BBC saw one of his articles and contacted him to see if he would be interested in presenting. He is now the only disabled presenter on Gardeners' World and the gardening expert on BBC Morning Live and has his own shows on QVC and QVC Style. Mark also produced the ITV ITV Ident for January 2021 with Sharon Walters

Mark was a finalist for 'Celebrity of the Year' in the National Diversity Awards 2021. Mark Lane Designs Ltd has also won numerous garden design awards in the UK and overseas and works closely with BALI, RHS and the BBC.

Mark's philanthropic work is far reaching. He is Patron of Core Arts, a Trustee for Gardening with Disabilities Trust, an Ambassador for Groundwork, Thrive, Greenfingers, Melanoma Fund, Leonard Cheshire and BALI.

Mark lives in Lincolnshire with his civil partner Jasen.

Mark's first book "Royal Gardens of the World" was published in 2020 by Kyle Books.

References

Horticulturists
1969 births
British television presenters
Living people
Alumni of University College London
Television presenters with disabilities